Wireless ambulatory electrocardiography (ECG) is a type of ambulatory electrocardiography with recording devices that use wireless technology, such as Bluetooth and smartphones, for at-home cardiac monitoring (monitoring of heart rhythms). These devices are generally recommended to people who have been previously diagnosed with arrhythmias and want to have them monitored, or for those who have suspected arrhythmias and need to be monitored over an extended period of time in order to be diagnosed.

Wireless ambulatory ECGs work in a way similar to a regular ECG by measuring the electrical potential of the heart through the skin.  The data is saved on an application on a smartphone, and then uploaded to a computer through Bluetooth or cloud technologies.  The information can also be sent through these technologies or through email to a doctor or cardiac technician.

Wireless ambulatory ECGs are able to provide voice alarm messages when cardiac abnormalities occur, such as bradycardia, and can record this information and provide a screen prompt for the patient to view the data.  The devices can also store mass amounts of ECG data on the phone, replay the ECG readings at a high speed, and have a low-voltage alarm function to not waste the battery life.  These characteristics of the devices are seen as benefits in comparison to current ambulatory ECG monitoring equipment such as the Holter monitor.



Recent technologies 

1. CardioSecur ACTIVE is a smartphone based 15-lead mobile ECG for patients. While conventional ECG systems use ten electrodes to depict twelve standard leads, CardioSecur requires only four electrodes. CardioSecur's four-electrode technology has been clinically validated and is an alternative to ten electrode systems.
It provides an instant and personalized evaluation of ECG recordings and offers patients an immediate recommendation to act according to the applicable guidelines of professional cardiological associations. CardioSecur ACTIVE allows cardiovascular patients to gain more certainty about their cardiac activity. Additionally, it enables physicians to diagnose heart diseases faster as treating physicians can access their patients' ECG recordings through a secure database to which the recordings are automatically uploaded. Furthermore, the ECGs can be easily shared via iMessage, email, AirDrop or AirPrint.

2. Alivecor heart monitors are currently available in the United States, the UK, and Ireland.  The device is a small handheld single-channel ECG recording device that immediately sends information to a smartphone. Recordings can then be sent to a cardiac technician or a certified cardiologist for a small cost.  AliveCor obtains ECG traces through sensing plates, which can also be purchased through AliveCor.  The plates are placed on fingers or the chest and the scan takes 30 seconds to complete.  One of the benefits of AliveCor is the ability to record notes of how the patient was feeling prior to taking the ECG so that the physician has a clear picture of what the patterns indicate.  Studies on the algorithm used in the technology have indicated that the device provides sufficiently accurate data to be able to diagnose atrial fibrillations.  The accuracy has been found to be similar to Lead 1 data of a regular 12-lead ECG.

3.  created a wireless ECG monitor that is placed on the chest under clothing, and the data are sent to mobile phones and is readily available for healthcare professionals.  The device is small and lightweight, making it easy to participate in daily activities.  It uses Bluetooth technology to send the information to cell phones, but it can also be connected to a computer via USB cable.

4. Qardio created a wearable ECG monitor that wirelessly sends data to the smartphone for the user and health practitioners. The device can be worn every day to track heart health in real life.

5. Beurer produces a single-channel ECG monitor without dedicated electrodes that transmits data via Bluetooth to a smartphone. It is very small and easy to carry around, but is not designed to continuously measure data. The device returns a preliminary analysis of the ECG recording, and detailed data can be later on shown to a physician.

References

Health informatics
Cardiology
Medical monitoring equipment